The Kentucky River Museum is located in Boonesborough, Kentucky, in Fort Boonesborough State Park.

Established in 2002, the museum occupies the former lock operator's home and storage and maintenance building for Lock 10, one of fourteen locks on the Kentucky River which were originally built by the U.S. Army Corps of Engineers.  The ten uppermost ones (locks 5 through 14) are now operated by the Kentucky River Authority.

External links
 The River Museum Fort Boonesborough Foundation

Transportation museums in Kentucky
Museums established in 2002
Museums in Madison County, Kentucky
Canal museums in the United States
2002 establishments in Kentucky
Buildings and structures in Madison County, Kentucky
Locks of Kentucky